Pseudaspidimerus uttami is a species of lady beetle native to India and Sri Lanka.

Description
Body primarily black, with yellowish anterior corners of pronotum. Elytra with two oval rounded discal spots which are orange yellow  in color. Prosternal process is short and squat. The area bound by prosternal carinae is parabolic.

Biology
It is a predator of several whiteflies, aphids and scale insects such as Aphis gossypii, and Planococcus citri.

References 

Coccinellidae
Insects of Sri Lanka
Beetles described in 1948